Winfield, New York may refer to
Winfield (town), New York
West Winfield, New York
Winfield, Queens, now eastern Woodside, Queens